Louis Whorley "Red" Hasslock (February 8, 1888 – April 5, 1974) was a college football player, colonel, and regimental instructor.

College football
Hasslock was a guard for Dan McGugin's Vanderbilt Commodores of Vanderbilt University. He was selected All-Southern in 1908, a year in which he had to contend for a spot with College Football Hall of Fame member Nathan Dougherty. Before Vanderbilt played Michigan in 1908, Hasslock had been on duty at Reelfoot Lake with a militia who were to guard against night riders.  When he learned he could be granted a leave of absence if he were to join his football team, he walked a distance of twenty miles through a country infested with night riders, and caught a train at Union City.

References

External links

American football guards
Vanderbilt Commodores football players
All-Southern college football players
1888 births
1974 deaths
Players of American football from Nashville, Tennessee
People from Santa Barbara, California